Kern is an unincorporated community in Macon County, in the U.S. state of Missouri.

The community has the name of Robert Kern, a St. Louis judge.

References

Unincorporated communities in Macon County, Missouri
Unincorporated communities in Missouri